Amelia Elizabeth Dyer (née Hobley; 1836 – 10 June 1896) was an English serial killer who murdered infants in her care over a thirty-year period during the Victorian era of the United Kingdom. Trained as a nurse and widowed in 1869, Dyer turned to baby farming—the practice of adopting unwanted infants in exchange for money—to support herself. She initially cared for the children legitimately, in addition to having two of her own, but whether intentionally or not a number of them died in her care, leading to a conviction for neglect and six months' hard labour. She then began directly murdering children she "adopted", strangling at least some of them, and disposing of the bodies to avoid attention. Mentally unstable, she was committed to several mental asylums throughout her life, despite suspicions of feigning, and survived at least one serious suicide attempt.

Dyer's downfall came when the bagged corpse of an infant was discovered in the River Thames, with evidence leading to her. She was arrested on 4 April 1896. In one of the most sensational trials of the Victorian period, she was found guilty of the murder of infant Doris Marmon and hanged on 10 June 1896. At the time of her death, a handful of murders were attributed to Dyer, but there is little doubt she was responsible for many more similar deaths—up to 400 (or possibly more), making her a candidate for history's most prolific serial killer.

Dubbed the "Ogress of Reading", Dyer inspired a popular murder ballad, and her case led to stricter laws for adoption and child protection, and also helped raise the profile of the fledgling National Society for the Prevention of Cruelty to Children (NSPCC), which formed in 1884.

Background
Amelia Dyer was born the youngest of five (with three brothers  Thomas, James and William  and a sister, Ann) in the small village of Pyle Marsh, just east of Bristol, the daughter of master shoemaker Samuel Hobley and Sarah Hobley (née Weymouth). Amelia learned to read and write and developed a love of literature and poetry. However, her childhood was marred by the mental illness of her mother, caused by typhus. Amelia witnessed her mother's violent fits and was obliged to care for her until she died in 1848. Researchers later commented on the effect this had on Dyer, and also what it taught her about the symptoms exhibited by those who appear to lose their mind through illness.

Dyer had an elder sister, Sarah Ann, who died in 1841 at age 6, and a younger sister, also named Sarah Ann, who died in 1845 aged a few months. An elder cousin had an illegitimate daughter at the time who was later accepted as the daughter of the grandparents, William and Martha Hobley, who were Dyer's aunt and uncle. After her mother's death Amelia lived with an aunt in Bristol for a time before serving an apprenticeship with a corset maker. Her father died in 1859. Her eldest brother, Thomas, inherited the family shoe business. In 1861, at the age of 24, Amelia became permanently estranged from at least one of her brothers, James, and moved into lodgings in Trinity Street, Bristol. There she married George Thomas. George was 59 and they both lied about their ages on the marriage certificate to reduce the age gap. George deducted eleven years from his age and Amelia added six years to hers—many sources later reported this age as fact, causing much confusion.

Nursing
After marrying George Thomas, Dyer trained as a nurse. From contact with a midwife, Ellen Dane, she learned of an easier way to earn a living—using her own home to provide lodgings for young women who had conceived illegitimately and then farming off the babies for adoption or allowing them to die of neglect and malnutrition. (Dane was forced to decamp to the US, shortly after meeting Amelia, to escape the attention of the authorities.) Unmarried mothers during the Victorian period often struggled to gain an income since the 1834 Poor Law Amendment Act had removed any financial obligation from the fathers of illegitimate children, whilst bringing up their children in a society where single parenthood and illegitimacy were stigmatized. This led to the practice of baby farming, in which individuals acted as adoption or fostering agents in return for regular payments or a single, up-front fee from the babies' mothers. Many businesses were set up to take in these young women and care for them until they gave birth. The mothers subsequently left their unwanted babies to be looked after as "nurse children".

The predicament of the parents involved were often exploited for financial gain: if a baby had well-off parents who wanted to keep the birth secret, the single fee might be as much as eighty pounds. Fifty pounds might be negotiated if the father of the child wanted to hush up his involvement. However, it was more common for these expectant young women to be impoverished. Such women would be charged about five pounds.

Unscrupulous carers resorted to starving the farmed-out babies, to save money and even to hasten death. Noisy or demanding babies could be sedated with easily available alcohol and/or opiates. Godfrey's Cordial—known colloquially as "Mother's Friend" (a syrup containing opium)—was a frequent choice, but there were several other similar preparations. Many children died as a result of such dubious practices: "Opium killed far more infants through starvation than directly through overdose." Dr. Greenhow, investigating for the Privy Council, noted how children "kept in a state of continued narcotism will be thereby disinclined for food, and be but imperfectly nourished." Death from severe malnutrition would result, but the coroner was likely to record the death as debility from birth,' or 'lack of breast milk,' or simply 'starvation.  Mothers who chose to reclaim or simply check on the welfare of their children could often encounter difficulties, but some would simply be too frightened or ashamed to tell the police about any suspected wrongdoing. Even the authorities often had problems tracing any children that were reported missing.

This was the world opened up to her by the now-departed Ellen Dane. Dyer had to leave nursing with the birth of a daughter, Ellen Thomas. In 1869 the elderly George Thomas died and Amelia needed an income.

Murders
Dyer was keen to make money from baby farming, and alongside taking in expectant women, she advertised to nurse and adopt a baby, in return for a substantial one-off payment and adequate clothing for the child. In her advertisements and meetings with clients, she assured them that she was respectable and married and that she would provide a safe and loving home for the child.

In 1872, Amelia married William Dyer, a brewer's laborer from Bristol. They had two children together: Mary Ann, also known as Polly, and William Samuel. Amelia eventually left her husband.

At some point in her baby farming career, Dyer decided to forgo the expense and inconvenience of letting the children die through neglect and starvation; soon after the receipt of each child, she murdered them, thus allowing her to pocket most or all of the fee.

For some time, Dyer eluded the resulting interest of the police. She was eventually caught in 1879 after a doctor was suspicious about the number of child deaths he had been called to certify in Dyer's care. However, instead of being convicted of murder or manslaughter, she was sentenced to six months' hard labour. The experience allegedly almost destroyed her mentally, though others have expressed incredulity at the leniency of the sentence when compared to those handed out for lesser crimes at that time.

Upon release, she attempted to resume her nursing career. She had spells in mental hospitals due to mental instability and suicidal tendencies; these always coincided with times when it was convenient for her to "disappear". Being a former asylum nurse Dyer knew how to behave to ensure a relatively comfortable existence as an asylum inmate. Dyer appears to have begun abusing alcohol and opium-based products early in her killing career; her mental instability could have been related to her substance abuse. In 1890, Dyer cared for the illegitimate baby of a governess. When she returned to visit the child, the governess was immediately suspicious and stripped the baby to see if a birthmark was present on one of its hips. It wasn't, and prolonged suspicions by the authorities led to Dyer having or feigning, a breakdown. Dyer at one point drank two bottles of laudanum in a serious suicide attempt, but her long-term use had built up her tolerance to opium products, so she survived.

She returned to baby farming and murder. Dyer realized the folly of involving doctors to issue death certificates and began disposing of the bodies herself. The precarious nature and extent of her activities again prompted undesirable attention; she was alert to the attention of police—and of parents seeking to reclaim their children. She and her family frequently relocated to different towns and cities to escape suspicion, regain anonymity—and to acquire new business. Over the years, Dyer used a succession of aliases.

In 1893, Dyer was discharged from her final committal at the Somerset and Bath Lunatic Asylum near Wells. Unlike previous "breakdowns", this had been a most disagreeable experience and she never entered another asylum. Two years later, Dyer moved to Caversham, Berkshire, accompanied by an unsuspecting associate, Jane "Granny" Smith, whom Dyer had recruited from a brief spell in a workhouse and Dyer's daughter and son-in-law, Mary Ann (known as Polly) and Arthur Palmer. This was followed by a move to 45 Kensington Road, Reading, Berkshire later the same year. Smith was persuaded by Dyer to be referred to as 'mother' in front of innocent women handing over their children. This was an effort to present a caring mother-daughter image.

The Murder of Doris Marmon 
In January 1896, Evelina Marmon, a popular 25-year-old barmaid, gave birth to an illegitimate daughter, Doris, in a boarding house in Cheltenham. She quickly sought offers of adoption and placed an advertisement in the "Miscellaneous" section of the Bristol Times & Mirror newspaper. It simply read: "Wanted, respectable woman to take a young child." Marmon intended to go back to work and hoped to eventually reclaim her child.

Coincidentally, next to her own, was an advertisement reading: "Married couple with no family would adopt a healthy child, nice country home. Terms, £10". Marmon responded, to a "Mrs. Harding", and a few days later she received a reply from Dyer. From Oxford Road in Reading, "Mrs. Harding" wrote that "I should be glad to have a dear baby girl, one I could bring up and call my own." She continued: "We are plain, homely people, in fairly good circumstances. I don't want a child for money's sake, but the company and home comfort ... I and my husband are dearly fond of children. I have no child of my own. A child with me will have a good home and a mother's love".

Evelina Marmon wanted to pay a more affordable, weekly fee for the care of her daughter, but "Mrs. Harding" insisted on being given the one-off payment in advance. Marmon was in dire straits, so she reluctantly agreed to pay the £10, and a week later "Mrs. Harding" arrived in Cheltenham.

Marmon was surprised by Dyer's advanced age and stocky appearance, but as Dyer was affectionate towards Doris, Evelina handed over her daughter, a cardboard box of clothes, and £10. Still distressed at having to give up care for her daughter, Evelina accompanied Dyer to Cheltenham station, and then on to Gloucester. She returned to her lodgings "a broken woman". A few days later, she received a letter from "Mrs. Harding" saying all was well; Marmon wrote back, but received no reply.

Dyer did not travel to Reading, as she had told Marmon. She went instead to 76 Mayo Road, Willesden, London where her 23-year-old daughter Polly was staying. There, Dyer quickly found some white edging tape used in dressmaking, wound it twice around the baby's neck and tied a knot. Death would not have been immediate. Dyer later said: "I used to like to watch them with the tape around their neck, but it was soon all over with them."

Both women allegedly helped to wrap the body in a napkin. They kept some of the clothes Marmon had packed; the rest was destined for the pawnbroker. Dyer paid the rent to the unwitting landlady and gave her a pair of child's boots as a present for her little girl. The following day, Wednesday 1 April 1896, another child, named Harry Simmons, was taken to Mayo Road. However, with no spare white edging tape available, the length around Doris's corpse was removed and used to strangle the 13-month-old boy.

On 2 April, both bodies were stacked into a carpet bag, along with bricks for added weight. Dyer then headed for Reading. At a secluded spot she knew well near a weir at Caversham Lock, she forced the carpetbag through railings into the River Thames.

Dyer's downfall

Discovery of corpses 
Unbeknownst to Dyer, on 30 March 1896, a package was retrieved from the Thames at Reading by a bargeman. The package Dyer dumped was not weighted adequately and had been easily spotted. It contained the body of a baby girl, later identified as Helena Fry. In the small detective force available to Reading Borough Police, Detective Constable Anderson made a crucial breakthrough. As well as finding a label from Temple Meads station, Bristol, he used microscopic analysis of the wrapping paper and deciphered a faintly legible name—Mrs. Thomas—and an address.

This evidence was enough to lead police to Dyer, but they still had no strong evidence to connect her directly with a serious crime. Additional evidence they gleaned from witnesses, and information obtained from Bristol police, only served to increase their concerns, and D.C. Anderson, with Sgt. James placed Dyer's home under surveillance. Subsequent intelligence suggested that Dyer would abscond if she came at all under suspicion. The officers decided to use a young woman as a decoy, hoping she would be able to secure a meeting with Dyer to discuss her services. This may have been designed to help the detectives to positively link Dyer to her business activities, or it may have simply given them a reliable opportunity to arrest her.

It transpired that Dyer was expecting her new client (the decoy) to call, but instead, she found detectives waiting on her doorstep. On 3 April (Good Friday), the police raided her home. They were struck by the stench of human decomposition, although no human remains were found. There was, however, plenty of other related evidence, including white edging tape, telegrams regarding adoption arrangements, pawn tickets for children's clothing, receipts for advertisements and letters from mothers inquiring about the well-being of their children.

The police calculated that in the previous few months alone, at least twenty children had been placed in the care of a "Mrs. Thomas", now revealed to be Amelia Dyer. It also appeared that she was about to move home again, this time to Somerset. This rate of murder has led to some estimates that Mrs. Dyer may, over decades, have killed over 400 babies and children, making her one of the most prolific murderers ever.

Dyer was arrested on 4 April and charged with murder. Her son-in-law Arthur Palmer was charged as an accessory. During April, the Thames was dredged and six more bodies were discovered, including Doris Marmon and Harry Simmons—Dyer's last victims. Each baby had been strangled with white tape, which as she later told the police "was how you could tell it was one of mine".
Eleven days after handing her daughter to Dyer, Evelina Marmon, whose name had emerged in items kept by Dyer, identified her daughter's remains.

Inquest and trial

At the inquest into the deaths in early May, no evidence was found that Mary Ann or Arthur Palmer had acted as Dyer's accomplices. Arthur Palmer was discharged as the result of a confession written by Amelia Dyer. In Reading Gaol she wrote (with her spelling and punctuation preserved):

On 22 May 1896, Dyer appeared at the Old Bailey and pleaded guilty to one murder, that of Doris Marmon. Her family and associates testified at her trial that they had been growing suspicious and uneasy about her activities, and it emerged that Dyer had narrowly escaped discovery on several occasions. Evidence from a man who had seen and spoken to Dyer when she had disposed of the two bodies at Caversham Lock also proved significant. Her daughter had given graphic evidence that ensured Dyer's conviction.

The only defence Dyer offered was insanity: she had been twice committed to asylums in Bristol. However, the prosecution argued successfully that her exhibitions of mental instability had been a ploy to avoid suspicion; both committals were said to have coincided with times when Dyer was concerned her crimes might have been exposed.

Execution
It took the jury only four and a half minutes to find her guilty. In her three weeks in the condemned cell, she filled five exercise books with her "last true and only confession".  A chaplain visited her the night before her execution and asked if she had anything to confess, she offered him her exercise books, saying, "isn't this enough?" Curiously, she was subpoenaed to appear as a witness in Polly's trial for murder, set for a week after her execution date. However, it was ruled that Dyer was already legally dead once sentenced and that therefore her evidence would be inadmissible. Thus, her execution was not delayed. On the eve of her execution, Dyer heard that the charges against Polly had been dropped. Dyer was hanged by James Billington at Newgate Prison on Wednesday, 10 June 1896. Asked on the scaffold if she had anything to say, she said "I have nothing to say", just before being dropped at 9:00a.m. precisely.

Later developments
It is uncertain how many more children Amelia Dyer murdered. However, inquiries from mothers, evidence of other witnesses, and material found in Dyer's homes, including letters and many babies' clothes, pointed to many more.

The Dyer case caused a scandal. She became known as the "Ogress of Reading", and she inspired a popular ballad:

Adoption laws were subsequently made stricter, giving local authorities the power to police baby farms in the hope of stamping out abuse. Despite this and the scrutinizing of newspaper personal ads, the trafficking and abuse of infants did not stop. Two years after Dyer's execution, railway workers inspecting carriages at Newton Abbot, Devon, found a parcel. Inside was a three-week-old girl but, though cold and wet, she was alive. The daughter of a widow, Jane Hill, the baby had been given to Mrs. Stewart, for £12. She had picked up the baby at Plymouth—and dumped her on the next train. It has been claimed that "Mrs. Stewart" was Polly, the daughter of Amelia Dyer.

Identified victims
Doris Marmon, 4 months old
Harry Simmons, 13 months old
Helena Fry, age unknown, 1 year old or younger

Jack the Ripper speculation
Because she was a murderess alive at the time of the Jack the Ripper killings, some have suggested that Dyer was Jack the Ripper. This suggestion was put forward by author William Stewart, although he preferred Mary Pearcey as his chosen suspect. There is, however, no evidence to connect Dyer to the Jack the Ripper murders, and she does not figure prominently among the Jack the Ripper suspects.

In popular culture
The character of Amelia Dyer appeared in the short story "The Baby Farmer" by Philip Fracassi in his horror collection Behold the Void.

English folk singer Reg Meuross wrote a song about Dyer called "The Angel Maker", which is a track on his 2018 album Songs About A Train.

The Amelia Dyer case was partly dramatized on an episode of the 2022 BBC Radio podcast series Lucy Worsley's Lady Killers.

See also
Minnie Dean
Miyuki Ishikawa
Genene Jones
Frances Knorr
John and Sarah Makin
Dagmar Overbye
Amelia Sach and Annie Walters
Louise Porton
Capital punishment in the United Kingdom
Infanticide in 19th-century New Zealand
List of serial killers in the United Kingdom

References

Further reading
 
 Rose, Lionel (1986). The Massacre of the Innocents, Routledge, p. 160 
 "'Baby Farming' – a tragedy of Victorian times.".
 Vale, Allison; Alison Rattle (2007). Amelia Dyer: Angel Maker. Andre Deutsch. 
 James, Mike (ed.) (1994). Bedside Book of Murder Forum Press / True Crime Library. 

1837 births
1879 murders in the United Kingdom
1896 deaths
19th-century executions by England and Wales
English murderers of children
English people convicted of murder
English serial killers
Executed British female serial killers
Executed English women
Executed people from Bristol
Infanticide
Baby farming
Nurses convicted of killing patients
Women of the Victorian era